Littoraria undulata, common name the robust shell, is a species of sea snail, a marine gastropod mollusk in the family Littorinidae, the winkles or periwinkles.

Description
Up to 2 cm, with dull brown coloration, occasionally darker on upper whorls, and with very faint pattern of wide zigzag lines (pattern fading in larger specimens).

Habitat: on rocks, mangrove trunks and drift wood.

Distribution
This species occurs in the Indo-Pacific Region and off the Philippines.

References

 Philippi, R.A. (1846). Descriptions of a new species of Trochus, and of eighteen new species of Littorina, in the collection of H. Cuming, Esq. Proc. Zool. Soc. Lond. 13: 138-143
 Reid, D.G. (1986). The littorinid molluscs of mangrove forests in the Indo-Pacific region. British Museum (Natural History), London
 Reid, D. G. (1992). The gastropod family Littorinidae in Hong Kong. In Proceedings of the fourth international marine biological workshop: The marine flora and fauna of Hong Kong and southern China (ed. Morton, B.). The marine flora and fauna of Hong Kong and southern China III, vol. 1, pp. 187–210. Hong Kong University Press, Hong Kong
 Steyn, D.G. & Lussi, M. (1998) Marine Shells of South Africa. An Illustrated Collector's Guide to Beached Shells. Ekogilde Publishers, Hartebeespoort, South Africa, ii + 264 pp.
 Lozouet, P. & Plaziat, J.-C., 2008 Mangrove environments and molluscs, Abatan river, Bohol and Panglao islands, central Philippines, pp. 1–160, 38 pls
 Liu, J.Y. [Ruiyu] (ed.). (2008). Checklist of marine biota of China seas. China Science Press. 1267 pp
 Reid, D.G., Dyal, P., & Williams, S.T. (2010). Global diversification of mangrove fauna: a molecular phylogeny of Littoraria (Gastropoda: Littorinidae). Molecular Phylogenetics and Evolution. 55:185-201

External links
 Gray, J. E. & Sowerby, G. B. I. (1839). Molluscous animals and their shells. Pp. 103-155, pls 33-34 [pp. 103-142 by J. E. Gray, 143-155 by G. B. Sowerby I]. In: The zoology of Capt. Beechey's voyage, compiled from the collections on notes made by Captain Beechey, the officers and naturalist of the expedition during a voyage to the Pacific and Behring's straits in his Majesty's ship Blossom, under the command of Captain F. W. Beechey in the years 1825, 26, 27 and 28. London pp. XII + 186 + 44 pl.
 Gould A.A. (1849). [Descriptions of new species of shells, brought home by the U. S. Exploring Expedition]. Proceedings of the Boston Society of Natural History. 3: 83-85, 89-92, 106-108, 118-121
 Reid D.G. (1989) The comparative morphology, phylogeny and evolution of the gastropod family Littorinidae. Philosophical Transactions of the Royal Society B 324: 1-110.

Littorinidae
Gastropods described in 1839
Taxa named by John Edward Gray